Bryan Alexander Green (born 30 June 1957) is a former Australian politician. He was the leader of the parliamentary Labor Party in Tasmania from 2014 to 2017, and a member of the Tasmanian House of Assembly in the electorate of Braddon from 1998 to 2017.

Early life
A native of New South Wales, Green was born in Wollongong. His family later moved to George Town, Tasmania and then to Burnie, Tasmania, where he attended Burnie High School and Burnie Technical College.

From 1974 to 1993, he worked as a machinist for the Burnie mills of Australian Paper. He then spent three years as an electorate officer for Senator Kay Denman, and then several years as a state organiser for the Australian Manufacturing Workers Union (AMWU).

Political career

Green entered the Tasmanian parliament at the 1998 election. He was appointed to the ministerial portfolio of Primary Industries, Water and Environment in 2002.  Following a reshuffle precipitated by the resignation of Premier Jim Bacon due to ill-health, Green was promoted to Minister of Infrastructure, Energy and Resources in 2004.

As Minister for Primary Industries, Water and Environment, Green was responsible for obtaining Parliamentary support for construction of the Meander Dam, a major water project that was opposed by conservationists.  As Transport Minister he proposed lowering the states speed limits on rural roads from 100 km/h to 90 km/h, a proposition that was met with somewhat of a backlash. Green later was appointed as the chairman of the Tasmanian Road Safety Council. He was the key negotiator with freight rail company Pacific National, which in September 2005 threatened to 'pull out' of intermodal operations in the State, forcing all containerised and coal rail freight onto the road. While Green initially showed little sign of weakness stating 'Tasmania will not be held at mercy to profitable companies' he later backed down and agreed to a $120 million rescue package ($80 million funded by the Australian federal government) to the company.

Other political achievements by Green included restructuring Tasmania's four port companies into a single entity, supporting a wide-ranging review into public passenger transport services, and increasing transparency in the forestry sector, through changes to Freedom of Information laws and by supporting the role of the Forest Practices Authority.  There has long been speculation, mostly arising from the Opposition, that Green has a strong ambition to become Premier.

David Bartlett quit the Premiership in 2011, and when Lara Giddings succeeded Bartlett, Green once again became Deputy Premier. In March 2014, following the resignation of Giddings (who had been defeated by Will Hodgman in the state election), Green was elected Labor leader in Tasmania after gaining unanimous support from colleagues, with Michelle O'Byrne as his deputy. As Green was Giddings' deputy prior to his elevation as leader, this marked the fourth time in a row that the Tasmanian ALP leader had been succeeded by his or her deputy.

On the morning of 17 March 2017, Green told a party meeting that he was retiring from politics. This came amid speculation that party insiders were pressuring Giddings to leave politics and clear the way for trade unionist and former cabinet minister David O'Byrne to return to the legislature and take the leadership. Shadow health minister Rebecca White was elected unopposed to replace him, and Green's seat in Braddon was filled by a recount. He was the first Tasmanian Labor leader in decades not to take the party into an election.

TCC Scandal 

On 14 July 2006 Green resigned from all leadership and frontbench positions following an enquiry by Auditor-General Mike Blake. This enquiry examined Green's 15 February deal with Tasmanian Compliance Corporation. The suspect deal promised the TCC company, part-owned by two former Labor ministers (John White and Glen Milliner), a three-year exclusive business monopoly from the Government or $2.5 million compensation.

Premier Paul Lennon sought the resignation; he called in the Director of Public Prosecutions to decide whether Green broke the law in signing the secret deal. The Premier made the decision after discussions with the Solicitor-General, Bill Bale, who advised that the DPP should consider whether the deal breached the criminal code. The offence carries a jail term of up to 21 years.

On 25 October 2006, Green appeared in court in relation to this matter charged with conspiracy and attempting to interfere with an executive officer and was represented by Stephen Estcourt.  One of Green's advisers, Guy Nicholson, was also charged with conspiracy. TCC director John White was originally charged on both counts.  All conspiracy charges were later dropped by the DPP.  White pleaded guilty to the charge of attempting to interfere with an executive officer, however no conviction was recorded.

Green faced trial in December 2007 which ended in a hung jury. A 2008 retrial also ended in a hung jury, with the DPP subsequently dropping the charges.

References

External links

Personal website 
Bryan Green's maiden speech to parliament

1957 births
Living people
Members of the Tasmanian House of Assembly
Deputy Premiers of Tasmania
Leaders of the Opposition in Tasmania
Australian Labor Party members of the Parliament of Tasmania
Australian trade unionists
Machinists
People from Wollongong
People from Burnie, Tasmania
21st-century Australian politicians